MATRADE Exhibition and Convention Centre (MECC) is a trade centre, exhibition hall, and convention centre in the suburb of Segambut, Kuala Lumpur, Malaysia. MECC, established by MATRADE (Malaysia External Trade Development Corporation), provides convention facilities, exhibition halls, and meeting rooms. MATRADE has also allocated a permanent exhibition space for 400 local companies at the exhibition hall on the second floor. The centre is also a component of Naza TTDI’s KL Metropolis development which is expected to be fully completed within 12 to 15 years time.

In operation since 2 January 2007, MECC has hosted many trade related events. The Malaysia International Trade and Exhibition Centre (MITEC), which was a venue for the 2017 Southeast Asian Games, is located nearby.

Facts 
 Total exhibition area: 32,888 square meters.
 Indoor exhibition area consisting of Hall A, B, C, Matrade Hall; 8 collapsible and movable partitions for the meeting rooms; theatrette.
 Outdoor exhibition area including an amphitheatre and a 20,000 square meters car park.

Facilities
Function Rooms
Meeting Rooms
Theatrette
Amphitheatre
Exhibition Halls

Major events in MECC 
The 8th Malaysia International Food & Beverage Trade Fair.
Karnival Mega Wanita 2007
 Pet Expo Malaysia - Cat Edition
Super Home Ideas 2007
Global SMEs 2007
Herbal Asia 2007
Art Expo Malaysia 2007
INTRADE Malaysia
Furniture fair
Malaysia International Halal Showcase (23 - 27 June 2010)
Malaysia Fashion Week (MFW) on 4 – 7 November 2015

Transportation 
Go KL City Bus Magenta line serves here, connecting to nearby KTM Komuter Segambut and MRT Jinjang.

A station on the proposed MRT Circle Line  is planned for the area.

References

External links

MATRADE Exhibition & Convention Centre (MECC) official website

2007 establishments in Malaysia
Convention centres in Kuala Lumpur
Skyscrapers in Kuala Lumpur